Pekin is a hamlet in the towns of Cambria and Lewiston in Niagara County, New York, United States. It was a stop in the Underground Railroad.

It is the birthplace of the Free Methodist Church. USA.

References

Lewiston (town), New York
Hamlets in New York (state)
Hamlets in Niagara County, New York
Populated places on the Underground Railroad